The 2012 Asian Women’s Club Volleyball Championship was the 13th staging of the AVC Club Championships. The tournament was held in Nakhon Ratchasima, Thailand.

Pools composition
The teams are seeded based on their final ranking at the 2011 Asian Women's Club Volleyball Championship.

''* Withdrew

Preliminary round

Pool A

|}

|}

Pool B

|}

|}

Final round

Play-off

|}

Quarterfinals

|}

5th–8th semifinals

|}

Semifinals

|}

7th place

|}

5th place

|}

3rd place

|}

Final

|}

Final standing

Awards
MVP:  Yin Na (Tianjin)
Best Scorer:  Arisa Takada (Toray Arrows)
Best Spiker:  Zhang Xiaoting (Tianjin)
Best Blocker:  Wang Ning (Tianjin)
Best Server:  Nootsara Tomkom (Chang)
Best Setter:  Yao Di (Tianjin)
Best Libero:  Wang Qian (Tianjin)

References

External links
Asian Volleyball Confederation

Asian Women's Club Volleyball Championship
Asian Women's Club Volleyball Championship
International volleyball competitions hosted by Thailand